Pîrîta is a village in Dubăsari District, Moldova.

Notable people
 Vadim Pisari

References

Villages of Dubăsari District
Populated places on the Dniester